The quarter sovereign is a British bullion or collectors' coin, whose introduction was announced by the Royal Mint in January 2009. Comprising 1.997 grams of 22 carat or 0.9170 fine gold (the crown gold standard), the 13.5 mm diameter quarter sovereign is the smallest modern legal tender British gold coin, with a nominal value of 25 pence.

It is a quarter of the weight of a 'full' sovereign with an actual gold weight (AGW) of 0.0588 troy oz.  it continues to be minted, including some to proof quality.

The Royal Mint had produced two patterns for a quarter sovereign for circulation use, one denominated as five shillings, in 1853, but this coin never went into production, in part due to concerns about the small size of the coin and likely wear in circulation.

See also
Twenty-five pence coin
Crown

References

British gold coins
Bullion coins
Quarter-base-unit coins
Saint George and the Dragon